The Sandyston-Walpack Consolidated School District is a consolidated public school district that serves students in kindergarten through sixth grade from Sandyston Township and Walpack Township, two communities in Sussex County, New Jersey, United States. The school is located in the Layton section of Sandyston Township.

As of the 2018–19 school year, the district, comprising one school, had an enrollment of 138 students and 16.9 classroom teachers (on an FTE basis), for a student–teacher ratio of 8.2:1. In the 2016–17 school year, Sandyston-Walpack had the 26th smallest enrollment of any school district in the state, with 149 students.

The district is classified by the New Jersey Department of Education as being in District Factor Group "DE", the fifth-highest of eight groupings. District Factor Groups organize districts statewide to allow comparison by common socioeconomic characteristics of the local districts. From lowest socioeconomic status to highest, the categories are A, B, CD, DE, FG, GH, I and J.

Students in seventh through twelfth grade from Sandyston and Walpack Townships for public school attend Kittatinny Regional High School located in Hampton Township, which also serves students who reside in Fredon Township and Stillwater Township. The high school is located on a  campus in Hampton Township, about seven minutes outside of the county seat of Newton. Kittatinny Regional High School was recognized as a National Blue Ribbon School of Excellence in 1997-98. As of the 2018–19 school year, the high school had an enrollment of 941 students and 97.5 classroom teachers (on an FTE basis), for a student–teacher ratio of 9.7:1.

School
Sandyston Walpack Consolidated School had an enrollment of 133 students in grades K-6 in the 2018–19 school year.
Harold Abraham, Principal

Administration
Core members of the district's administration are:
William Kochis, Superintendent
Dr. Vincent Occhino, Business Administrator / Board Secretary

Board of education
The district's board of education, with nine members, sets policy and oversees the fiscal and educational operation of the district through its administration. As a Type II school district, the board's trustees are elected directly by voters to serve three-year terms of office on a staggered basis, with three seats up for election each year held (since 2012) as part of the November general election. The board appoints a superintendent to oversee the day-to-day operation of the district.

References

External links 
Sandyston-Walpack Consolidated School

Data for Sandyston-Walpack Consolidated School, National Center for Education Statistics
Kittatinny Regional High School

Sandyston Township, New Jersey
Walpack Township, New Jersey
New Jersey District Factor Group DE
School districts in Sussex County, New Jersey
Public elementary schools in New Jersey